Váci út (Váci Avenue, lit. Road to Vác) is one of the widest and busiest avenues in Budapest, Hungary. It is about 12 kilometers long and has four to eight traffic lanes.

Location 
It starts by the Grand Boulevard next to Nyugati Railway Station and runs to north in Angyalföld and Újpest - two populous former worker's district - crossing Dózsa György Avenue, Róbert Károly Boulevard and Árpád Avenue. There were several iron factories, tan-yards and clothes factories along Váci Avenue, it was one of the focal points of Hungarian workers' movement at the turn of the 20th century. Majority of factories closed after fall of the communism; banks, offices and other administrative buildings occupied former industrial areas.

Budapest Metro M3 runs under Váci Avenue, it has 7 metro stations from Nyugati pályaudvar to Újpest-városkapu (New Pest-City Gate, it was the city limit of Budapest before formation of Greater Budapest).

Notable buildings 

 Nyugati Railway Station (Nyugati pályaudvar)
 WestEnd City Center
 Lehel Market (Lehel piac, Lehel tér)
 Metropolitan Water Works HQ (Fővárosi Vízművek)
  (Budapesti Elektromos Művek)
 Central Authenticate Office (Központi Okmányiroda)
 Árpád Bridge Bus Station (Árpád híd buszpályaudvar, suburban bus station)
 Attila József Theatre (József Attila Színház)
 National Police HQ - Metropolitan Police HQ - Pest County Police HQ (Országos Rendőrfőkapitányság, Budapesti Rendőrfőkapitányság, Pest Megyei Rendőrfőkapitányság)
 Hungarian State Treasury (Magyar Államkincstár)
 National Pension Insurance (Országos Nyugdíjbiztosítási Főigazgatóság)
 National Health Insurance (Országos Egészségbiztosítási Pénztár)
 Axa Bank Europe SA Hungarian HQ (Axa Bank Europe SA Magyarországi Fióktelepe)
 State Public Health and Medical Officer's Institution (Állami Népegészségügyi és Tisztiorvosi Szolgálat)
 Madarász Street Children's Hospital (Madarász utcai Gyermekkórház)
 Danube Mall (Duna Pláza)
 Church of Scientology of Budapest (Szcientológia Egyház Budapest)
 Budapest Bank HQ (Budapest Bank székháza)
 New Pest-City Gate (Újpest-Városkapu, a huge Stalinist building complex at the intersection of Váci Avenue and Árpád Avenue, Újpest-Városkapu metro station and Újpest-Városkapu bus terminal named after the building complex)
 New Pest-City Gate Bus Station (Újpest-Városkapu buszpályaudvar, suburban bus station)
 Tungsram

Sources 

Budapest City Atlas, Dimap-Szarvas, Budapest, 2011, 

Streets in Budapest
Urban planning in Hungary